The Apostleship of the Sea is an agency of the Catholic Church. It is also sometimes known as Stella Maris (Star of the Sea), and its patron is the Virgin Mary as Our Lady, Star of the Sea. Founded in Glasgow, Scotland in the early 20th century, it provides pastoral care to seafarers through chaplaincies in ports in all continents of the world.

AoS offers practical and pastoral care to all seafarers, regardless of nationality, belief or race.  The Apostleship of the Sea in Great Britain is part of an international network known to the maritime world as Stella Maris, working in more than 311 ports served by 216 port chaplains in more than 30 countries around the world.

History 
The modern movement began in the 1890s with several isolated and independent beginnings. In 1891 the Apostolate of Prayer first posted devotional magazines and books from Wimbledon College to twelve ships and began enrolling seafarers in this pious association. Two years later, The Society of Saint Vincent de Paul commenced visiting seafarers in the ports of Bristol, Sunderland, and Tyneside. In the same year a Catholic Seafarers’ Centre opened in Montreal.

The Apostleship of the Sea port ministry was founded in Glasgow in 1920. At this time Britain had one of the largest merchant fleets in the world, employing many thousands of British seafarers. The Apostleship of the Sea ran large seafarers’ hostels in all the major port towns where seafarers could stay while their ships were in port, often for weeks at a time. Hundreds of volunteers from the local parishes were involved in providing hospitality and entertainment for seafarers in these hostels, which were often full. Subsequently, through changes in technology crews became smaller and spent less time in port resulting in a reduced need for hostels so most contact is now through ships visits and drop-in centres.

It was a founder member of the International Christian Maritime Association in 1969.

Organization

In every major country, a bishop serves as the AOS episcopal promoter, overseeing the work of the national director. It is the director's responsibility to coordinate the chaplains’ efforts and to assist them in developing their ministries. Each country hosts an annual conference. Tying all these national conferences together is the Pontifical Council for the Pastoral Care of Migrants and Itinerant People. Because the Apostleship of the Sea's “parishioners” move around the world, it is necessary that their pastors be in touch with one another. The World Congress held every five years, mandated by the Apostolatus Maris (Apostleship of the Sea) office, ensures this connection between countries and disseminates the pontifical council's policies.

Ministry

When a ship enters a port inspectors from the national maritime authority may come on board. If the inspectors feel that the ship does not meet international health and safety regulations, they can put it under arrest. The ship may not leave the port until the situation is rectified. In these circumstances, owners may refuse to take responsibility and abandon their ships leaving the crew unpaid and without the means of returning to their home country. AOS is one of the organisations which has provided assistance including food and support sometimes for months to such seafarers.

AOS-USA operates the Cruise Ship Priest Program for the pastoral care of cruise ship passengers and crew, and to ensure that only valid priests in good standing, who have their Bishop's/Provincial's permission to serve are on board as Chaplains.

Most of its missions are under the care of Missionaries of St. Charles - Scalabrinian, a congregation that has a specific charism for seafarers and migrants.

AOS also works with the Santa Marta Group to assist seafarers and fishermen who have been trafficked or exploited, in situations of modern slavery.

Each year on the second Sunday of July the Catholic Church remembers seafarers and prays for them, their families and those who support them. Sea Sunday is AoS's principal fundraising and awareness raising event of the year.

Activities in 2018 
In 2018, Apostleship of the Sea in Great Britain had 20 port chaplains and 115 ship visiting volunteers. They visited 10,048 ships and assisted 221,056 seafarers and fishermen. A total of 83 Masses were celebrated on ships and 6,200 ships were visited where seafarers were offered welfare assistance.

See also
Sailors' Society
Finnish Seamen's Mission (Lutheran)
International Seafarers' Welfare and Assistance Network
Mission to Seafarers (Anglican)
The Marine Society (Seafarers' Charity)
The Royal National Mission to Deep Sea Fishermen (UK)
Sailortown

References

External links
Apostleship of the Sea Official website

Catholic lay organisations
Christian missions to seafarers